List of NRHP-registered historic places in Lubbock County, Texas

This list is intended to be a complete list of properties and districts listed on the National Register of Historic Places in Lubbock County, Texas. There are four districts and 15 individual properties including one National Historic Landmark in the county. Three properties are also Recorded Texas Historic Landmarks.

Current listings

The publicly disclosed locations of National Register properties and districts may be seen in a mapping service provided.

|}

See also

National Register of Historic Places listings in Texas
Recorded Texas Historic Landmarks in Lubbock County

References

External links

Registered Historic Places
Lubbock County
Buildings and structures in Lubbock County, Texas